Fyodor Timofeyevich Stellovsky was a prominent Russian publisher and editor.

Stellovsky was born in Moscow, Imperial Russia. Among the composers whose music he published were Alexander Dargomyzhsky, Alexey Verstovsky, Alexander Serov, Alexander Varlamov, Ivan Khandoshkin and Mikhail Glinka, whose  whole back catalogue he purchased in 1857. The popular works by several major foreign composers, including Mozart, Verdi and Weber have also came out through the Stellovsky Publishers for the first time in Russia.

In 1858—1860 Stellovsky edited and published Muzykalny i Teatralny Vestnik (Music and Theatre Herald), then the newspaper Russky Mir, the magazines Gudok and Yakor (Anchor), as well as the Music Album, a supplement to the Pantheon magazine. In 1860s Stellovsky moved into the literary publishing business too to launch the acclaimed series The Works by Russian Authors (Собрания сочинений русских авторов, 1861—1870). As part to it, the first major collections of several prominent Russian writers came out, including Lev Tolstoy (The Works of, parts 1 and 2, 1864), Alexey Pisemsky (vols. 1-4, 1861—1867) and Fyodor Dostoyevsky (vols. 1-4, 1865—1870). He died in Saint Petersburg.

References 

Russian editors
Businesspeople from Moscow
1826 births
1875 deaths

ru:Стелловский, Фёдор Тимофеевич